Joseph Jones (7 Mar 1837—12 September 1912), and his brothers William Highfield Jones and John Jones, were successful industrialists, benefactors and politicians.  All three became aldermen and served as Mayor of Wolverhampton.

Iron
Jones, and his brother John, founded the Corrugated Iron Company in 1857, specialising in flat or corrugated sheeting.

Borough council
Ironmaster Alderman Joseph Jones served as Mayor of Wolverhampton 1887/88.

Family
Jones was born in Wolverhampton on 7 Mar 1837, the son of jappaner Edward Jones and his wife Rebecca, née Highfield. Jones married Elizabeth 'Betsey' Pinson on 15 July 1865, and they had five children. After his marriage he lived on Goldthorn Hill, Wolverhampton. His brother John and his family lived close by. Jones died 12 September 1912 in Wolverhampton.

References

1837 births
1912 deaths
Mayors of Wolverhampton
Aldermen of Wolverhampton
People from Wolverhampton
English ironmasters
People of the Victorian era
19th-century English businesspeople